(Happy day, long hoped-for hours), is a cantata by J.S. Bach. He composed the work for the inauguration of a renovation of the Thomasschule, Leipzig.  It was first performed on 5 June 1732. The music is lost but the words of Johann Heinrich Winckler survived.

In 1731 work began on the reconstruction of the school building, giving it two more storeys. The Bach family, along with other residents, had to move out for a year.  On the Bachs' return they benefited from an enlarged apartment.  The building is no longer extant.

Libretto and structure 
Winckler was a colleague of Bach at the Thomasschule.  He was a versatile scholar whose interests included experimental physics, and he was later elected Fellow of the Royal Society.

The cantata has 10 movements.  In the middle of the work there was a pause for speeches, rather as some church cantatas were performed before and after the sermon.  The movements are as follows:

Music 
Bach often reused music written for one-off occasions.  In this case, he is believed to have reused the music for firstly another lost work Frohes Volk, vergnügte Sachsen, BWV Anh. 12 (composed in 1733 for the name day of the Elector of Saxony to a libretto by Picander). Additionally it was likely used for the chorus which opens Lobet Gott in seinen Reichen, BWV 11 (probably composed in 1735).
The chorus employs Lombard rhythm and is given a festive scoring with an instrumental ensemble featuring three trumpets.

Notes

References

External links 
  (libretto only)

1732 compositions
Secular cantatas by Johann Sebastian Bach
Lost musical works by Johann Sebastian Bach